Knob Lick is an unincorporated community in southern Saint Francois County, Missouri, United States. It is located on Missouri Route DD, just east of U.S. Route 67, approximately eight miles south of Farmington.

Knob Lick has a post office with zip code 63651, which has been in operation since 1870.
The community takes its name from nearby Knob Lick Mountain. In the Ozarks, knob typically refers to an isolated summit, and lick is a natural "salt lick" or salt spring. Eighty of the summit are protected by the Missouri Department of Conservation. A gravel road leads to the conservation area which includes a granite glade, picnic facilities, and a closed fire lookout tower.

Demographics

Notable people 

 Tom Bayless (born 1947), American football player (New York Jets)

References

External links
 Knob Lick, Missouri Community Portal

Unincorporated communities in St. Francois County, Missouri
Unincorporated communities in Missouri